Trent School may refer to:

Trent C of E Primary School, a primary school in Cockfosters, London, United Kingdom
Trent Valley Academy, a secondary school in Gainsborough, Lincolnshire, United Kingdom
Trent College, an independent school in Long Eaton, Derbyshire, United Kingdom
Elms School, a preparatory school associated with Trent College
Trent Independent School District, United States